Kelly Anne Mazzante (born February 2, 1982) is an American retired professional women's basketball player who last played for the Atlanta Dream of the WNBA. At the conclusion of her collegiate career, she was the all-time leading scorer in Big Ten basketball history (male or female). The record stood until she was surpassed on the scoring list by Rachel Banham in 2016 and again by Kelsey Mitchell in 2018.

Early life and college career
Mazzante attended Montoursville High School in Montoursville, Pennsylvania, which is also the alma mater of Mike Mussina, a pitcher for the New York Yankees.  She scored over 3,000 points in high school and finished as the third leading scorer in Pennsylvania girls' basketball history.

At an early age, Mazzante attended Penn State's Lady Lion Basketball Camp.  She went on to attend college at Penn State, where she was a star member of the women's basketball team, mainly playing in the shooting guard position.  Mazzante scored an outstanding 49 points and sank 9 three point shots against Minnesota during her sophomore season.  During her senior season, Kelly led her team to the Elite Eight, where they fell to the eventual champions, Connecticut.  She earned Kodak All-American honors three times (2002, 2003, and 2004).  She is the all-time leading scorer in the Big Ten Conference with 2,919 points in four seasons from 2001 to 2004. Through 133 NCAA appearances, she averaged 21.9 points per game. She also holds Big Ten records for Field Goals (1,051), Field Goals Attempted (2,403), 3 Point Field Goals (357), and 3 Point Field Goals Attempted (1,019).  She was a recipient of the NCAA Top Eight Award as part of the Class of 2005.  Mazzante's Penn State No. 13 jersey was retired on December 29, 2004.  She completed her undergraduate degree in advertising/public relations in the off-season while assisting the women's basketball team.

Mazzante was also a member of the 2002 USA World Championship for Young Women Qualifying Team that won the gold medal.

Penn State statistics

Source

Professional career 
Mazzante was selected in the second round of the 2004 WNBA Draft by the Charlotte Sting, where she spent three seasons as a reserve guard.  She scored a WNBA-career-high 18 points in an August 18, 2006, game against the Phoenix Mercury.  After the Charlotte Sting folded in January 2007, Mazzante was selected in the 2007 WNBA Dispersal Draft by the Mercury.  She contributed to the Mercury's victory in the 2007 and 2009 WNBA Finals, primarily as a three-point shooting specialist.  During her Phoenix Mercury days, Mazzante wrote a blog for PhoenixMercury.com called "Maz's Musings."

In March 2010, Mazzante was traded to the New York Liberty as part of a three-team, multi-player deal. However, she was released from the team a few weeks later, since she was in the middle of rehab for her ACL.

In the 2006–2007 WNBA offseason, Mazzante played in Slovakia for the Košice professional basketball team.  In the 2007–2008 WNBA offseason, she played in Russia for Spartak. During the winters of 2008–09 and 2009–10, she played in Hungary for MiZo Pécs (PVSK). In 2011, she signed with the San Antonio Silver Stars and later the Atlanta Dream of the WNBA. On January 21, 2014, Mazzante announced her retirement.

Personal
Mazzante has hosted her own basketball camp for girls and boys in Phillipsburg during the fall since 2007.

References

External links
 EuroBasket profile

1982 births
Living people
All-American college women's basketball players
American women's basketball players
Atlanta Dream players
Basketball players from Pennsylvania
Charlotte Sting players
Penn State Lady Lions basketball players
Phoenix Mercury players
Shooting guards
Sportspeople from Williamsport, Pennsylvania
Big Ten Athlete of the Year winners